Richard Grant may refer to:

Richard E. Grant (born 1957), British-Swazi actor
Richard E. Grant (paleontologist) (1927–1995), American paleontologist
Richard Grant (author) (born 1952), science fiction and fantasy author
Richard Grant (writer) (born 1963), travel writer
Richard Grant (diplomat), New Zealand diplomat; see List of ambassadors of New Zealand
Richard Grant (boxer) (born 1973), Jamaican light heavyweight boxer
Richard Grant (cricketer) (born 1984), Welsh cricketer
Richard P. Grant, British biologist
Richard W. Grant (1862–1939), architect based in Beatrice, Nebraska
Richard le Grant, Archbishop of Canterbury from 1229 to 1231
Dick Grant (1878–1958), American track and field athlete

See also
Richie Grant (disambiguation)